The following lists events that happened during 2000 in Denmark.

Incumbents
 Monarch - Margrethe II
 Prime minister - Poul Nyrup Rasmussen

Events

 2 July – The Øresund Bridge opens for traffic across the link, connecting Copenhagen and Malmö, Sweden.
 28 September – Euro referendum takes place on whether Denmark should switch its currency to the Euro. It was rejected with 53% of voters saying no and 47% saying yes.

Culture

Architecture

Art
 Floorless art collective is founded.

Film
 22 May – Lars von Trier's film Dancer in the Dark wins the Palme d'Or at the 2000 Cannes Film Festival.

Literature

Media
 12 February – It is announced that Claus Bjørn Larsen wins World Press Photo of the Year for an image of a wounded Kosovar Albanian refugee in the Albanian border town of Kukes in April 1999.

Music
19 February - Dansk Melodi Grand Prix 2000, the Danish selection process to Eurovision was won by Olsen Brothers with the song "Smuk som et stjerneskud". Lyrics were later changed into English (Fly on the Wings of Love)
13 May - In Stockholm Olsen Brothers gained a second victory for Denmark with 195 points and beating Russia by 40 points
 Eurodance band Infernal released their second album Waiting for Daylight, which contains songs like "Serengeti", "Sunrise" and "Muzaik"

Sports
 15 September – 1 October – Denmark at the 2000 Summer Olympics in Sydney: 2 gold medals, 3 silver medals and 1 bronze medal.

Football
 10 June – 2 July – Denmark participates in the UEFA Euro 2000 in Belgium and Netherlands but does not make it beyond the initial group stage after losing its games against France, Czech Republic and Netherlands.

Badminton
 Kastrup Magleby BK wins Europe Cup.
 25–29 April – With five gold medals, three silver medals and three bronze medals, Denmark finishes as the best nation at the 17th European Badminton Championships in Glasgow, Scotland.

Golf
 11 June – Steen Tinning wins The Celtic Manor Resort Wales Open on the 2000 European Tour.
 3 September – Thomas Bjørn wins BMW International Open on the 2000 European Tour.

Handball
 1 October – Denmark wins gold in the Women's handball tournament at the 2000 Summer Olympics by defeating Hungary 27–25 in the final.

Swimming
 3–9 July  Denmark wins two silver medals and two bronze medals at the 2000 European Aquatics Championships.

Other
 18 June – Tom Kristensen wins Le Mans as part of the Audi team.

Births

 12 August – Prince Achileas-Andreas of Greece and Denmark, second son and third child of Crown Prince Pavlos and Crown Princess Marie-Chantal of Greece

Deaths
 10 February  Karen Strand, silversmith (born 1924)
 25 April – Niels Viggo Bentzon, composer (born 1919)
 30 April – Poul Hartling, politician, former prime minister of Denmark (born 1914)
7 November - Queen Ingrid (born in 1910)

References

 
Denmark
Years of the 20th century in Denmark
Denmark
2000s in Denmark